The Double Gate, also known as the door of the Prophet, is two adjacent gates, located on the southern side of the wall of Al-Aqsa Mosque just under the pulpit of the Imam, where it leads to the courtyards of the mosque through a double door, a corridor 82 m long and about 13 m wide and is called by the public "Old Al-Aqsa". It ends with the staircase of its exit in front of the tribal chapel, 80 meters from the triple door. It is a very old door that may be traced back to the Byzantines. The Double Gate and the Triple Gate are both part of the Huldah Gate in the Southern Wall of the Temple Mount.

There is an opinion that the door is illiterate in the sense of the decorations of the magnificent top of the door, which resemble the decorations of the door of mercy (Umayyad of construction). The presence of Roman stones does not mean that the door is Roman in the reason of using the builders as a stone on it in Latin writing, But it was placed upside down, which indicates ignorance of its construction in the Latin language, otherwise they would have put it in the correct way. (The inscription is found on the front of the door from the outside).

The door was used as an entrance from the Umayyad palaces that were located south of the blessed Al-Aqsa Mosque to the mosque's courtyards through a long corridor known today as the Old Al-Aqsa.

Biblical archaeologists claim 
Biblical archaeologists claim that this gate is one of the gates of the alleged temple in the name of their eternity mentioned in their book “Book of Kings” This is a false claim that was not supported by historical or archaeological facts. In evidence of their confusion about naming, Jewish archaeologist Meir Ben Dov claims that the naming probably belongs to “the mole animal that digs underground and exits the other area” projecting that description on the door whose corridor runs under the mosque to the squares.

Names 
One of its names is «the door of the Prophet», where it is believed that the Prophet Muhammad entered from it on the journey of Israa, and Omar entered from him to the courtyards of the mosque while he was destroyed.

See also 

 Huldah Gates
 Gates of the Temple Mount

References 

Al-Aqsa Mosque
Doors
Prophets